Perth Middle Church is a former church building located in Perth, Perth and Kinross, Scotland. Standing on Tay Street, at its junction with George Inn Lane, it is adjoined to the south by Perth's Municipal Buildings. It was completed in 1887, the work of Hippolyte Blanc, and is now a Category B listed building.

See also

List of listed buildings in Perth, Scotland

References 

Category B listed buildings in Perth and Kinross
Listed churches in Scotland
Middle Church
1887 establishments in Scotland
Listed buildings in Perth, Scotland